Amravati Ki Kathayein is an Indian anthology TV series, based on the Telugu short story collection "Amaravati Kathalu" by Satyam Sankaramanchi. It was produced by Venugopal K Thakker (Provideo) and directed by Shyam Benegal and aired on the main channel of Indian National Broadcaster Doordarshan. It originally aired every Monday between May 29 to Aug 29, 1995 and had a total of 13 episodes. The series had a second run in 2005 also on Monday in 9:30 PM time slot.

The stories were based in village of Amaravati, in the state of Andhra Pradesh. It depicted snippets from daily life of the people of the village. In a review Sheila Vajpayee of Indian Express wrote, “Amaravati Ki Kathayein is a rebuke to all of us who consistently complain that television and quality are irreconcilable enemies." Writing for the Times of India Iqbal Masood called the series "path breaking" and urging Doordarshan "to make its channels more decent and civilized with series like Amaravati Ki Kathayein”. The episodes were 22½ minutes long.

Cast 

 Virendra Saxena
 Mohan Gokhale
 Ayesha Jalil
 Sulbha Arya
 Ashok Kumar
 Raghubir Yadav
 Neena Gupta
 Ravi Jhankal
 Pallavi Joshi
 Lalit Mohan Tiwari
 Suma Kanakala
 Shrivallabh Vyas
 Rakesh Srivastav

References

External links

 

Indian television series
Indian period television series
Television shows based on short fiction
DD National original programming
1995 Indian television series debuts
1995 Indian television series endings
Television shows set in Andhra Pradesh
Television shows based on Indian novels